"Secret Wars" is a 2015–16 comic book storyline published by Marvel Comics. It recalls the 1984–1985 miniseries of the same name. Released on May 6, 2015, the storyline includes a core Secret Wars miniseries, written by Jonathan Hickman and drawn by Esad Ribić, which picks up from where the "Time Runs Out" storyline running in The Avengers and New Avengers ended. The event also served as a conclusion to the Fantastic Four (which Hickman had written from 2009 through 2012) after Marvel decided to cancel the title due to a film rights dispute with 20th Century Fox and declining sales.

The storyline involves the destruction of the Marvel Universe and various other alternate universes (including those seen in the Ultimate Marvel and Marvel 2099 imprints, the "Age of Apocalypse" storyline, the Marvel 1602 universe, and the "House of M" storyline), with each universe's respective Earth combining with each other into Battleworld, a planet that exhibits the aspects of the various universes. The planet itself is divided in many territories that are mostly self-contained and where a "pocket universe" composed of a specific storyline or universe reside and evolve. Various versions of individual Marvel characters can be present multiple times on the Battleworld. For example, there is a Tony Stark present in many of the territories where the Kingdom of Manhattan has both the Earth-1610 and the Earth-616 versions, and many versions of Thor serve as a peace-keeping force. The stories depicted in the miniseries about each domain's characters' powers and personal histories vastly differ from the ones portrayed in the main Marvel universe(s). Following the events of this storyline Miles Morales, who originated within the Ultimate universe was integrated alongside his family (with his mother Rio and uncle Aaron being restored to life) and friends into the prime Marvel Universe or Earth-616.

The core limited series was originally to be eight issues long, but was later decided to extend to a ninth. The series ran for nine months. The miniseries are in three categories, which are Battleworld, Warzones, and Last Days. One of the core miniseries is Ultimate End which ends the Ultimate Marvel imprint after 15 years. Ultimate End was written by Brian Michael Bendis and artist Mark Bagley, the team that began the Ultimate Marvel universe with Ultimate Spider-Man.

The series was released to positive reviews, with critics praising the storyline, characters, action, and art styles.

Premise
The series was introduced with two issues in May 2015, then ran monthly until December. The series began with a nine-issue miniseries (plus a Free Comic Book Day issue #0) and came out of the current Avengers and New Avengers "Time Runs Out" storyline. The basic premise involves the collision of the Marvel 616 Universe with the Ultimate Marvel 1610 Universe, which destroys both. Pieces of the two universes are mysteriously saved and combined with other post-collision universes, creating the "Battleworld."

Tie-in branding
Numerous tie-in miniseries and ongoing titles fleshed out the event with many of them revisiting previous Marvel storylines such as "Civil War", "Age of Apocalypse", "Days of Future Past" (renamed, in this 2015 event, to "Years of Future Past") and "Armor Wars". All of the tie-ins were aligned into one of three subtitles during the event consisting of Last Days, Battleworld, and Warzones. Warzones, Battleworld and Last Days made Secret Wars one of the most expansive crossovers to date.

Marvel's executive editor Tom Brevoort revealed that "Last Days" would show several characters from Captain America and Ms. Marvel to Loki and Magneto in their final adventures before the Marvel Universe comes to an end in Secret Wars, "Warzones" would focus on the individual domains, and "Battleworld" would be concerned with the infrastructure of the Battleworld as a whole.

Plot

Issue one
As Doctor Doom, Doctor Strange, and the Molecule Man confront the Beyonders in a last-ditch attempt to save the Multiverse, the final Incursion of Earth-1610 and Earth-616 begins. Heroes from each universe confront one another. Mister Fantastic and the Maker (the Mister Fantastic of Earth-1610) make plans to survive the cataclysm with a small group of colleagues; Mister Fantastic selects heroes and important scientists, while the Maker intends to save himself and the Cabal. The Maker sends a doomsday weapon and the Children of Tomorrow to Earth-616. Black Bolt, Rocket Raccoon, Groot, Black Widow, Spider-Woman, and Beast are killed, and Stark Tower is destroyed. Meanwhile, the Kingpin hosts a viewing party of the incursion for villains. The festivities are interrupted by the arrival of the Punisher, who kills all the villains.

Manifold begins teleporting heroes to the lifeboat. Cyclops merges with the Phoenix Force and destroys the Children of Tomorrow before being teleported onto the ship. Mister Fantastic and Black Panther pilot the ship to the center of the Incursion. A hull breach occurs, separating the part of the ship carrying the Invisible Woman, the Thing and most of the young Future Foundation. They are destroyed by the Incursion before Mister Fantastic can rescue them. The world fades to white as the two Earths collide. Doctor Doom's mask appears out of the white void, before the white turns to black. The life raft comes to rest on a mysterious planet.

Issue two
A new Thor is shown joining the Thor Corps, a police force composed of different versions of Thor. The young Thor from the Battleworld domain of Higher Avalon tells the story of how God Emperor Doom created the Earth and the universe. The Thor of Higher Avalon and Old Thor travel to Bar Sinister to bring its baron Mister Sinister to Castle Doom, where Doom holds court from his throne on the World Tree. Sinister is charged with secretly aligning with Baron Hyperion of Utopolis in opposition to Higher Avalon. Sinister chooses to face his accuser Brian Braddock in battle and defeats him. Before he can deal the killing blow, God Emperor Doom intervenes. To save his brother, Baron James Braddock confesses to crimes against God Emperor Doom. God Emperor Doom banishes James to the Shield, a massive wall that protects God Emperor Doom's realm from outside horrors. Thor of Higher Avalon and Old Thor escort Baron James to the Shield, where he jumps into the Deadlands and dies fighting zombies.

In the Kingdom of Utopolis, Minister Alex Power is brought to an object uncovered by an "earthquake": the life raft from Earth-1610. Valeria tells Sheriff Strange that the object is much older than the believed age of Earth. Strange tasks the Thor of Higher Avalon and Old Thor to enforce a quarantine around the discovery site. One of the Moloid diggers on site inadvertently opens the craft, and Old Thor is killed by weapons thrown from within. The young Thor flees to tell Sheriff Strange what has happened. As he leaves, the Cabal and Maker emerge from the lifeboat. Thanos is told by a Moloid that they are in Battleworld.

Issue three
Sheriff Strange informs God Emperor Doom of recent events in the domains of Battleworld. Before a statue of the Molecule Man, they reminisce how God Emperor Doom had battled the Beyonders and managed to salvage various fragments of the Earths that were being destroyed. Sheriff Strange is summoned to Utopolis by the Thor Corps to examine the Cabal's life raft. A group of Thors are sent to apprehend the Cabal. Once all the Thors, aside from the Thor of Higher Avalon, have left, Sheriff Strange tells the hidden Miles Morales that he may come out of hiding. Miles reveals he snuck on to the ship just before the Incursion destroyed his planet.

On the Isle of Agamotto, Sheriff Strange explains Battleworld to Miles, then reveals he has found the other life raft. The Thor of Higher Avalon opens the vessel and the survivors of Earth-616 exit stasis. Sheriff Strange realizes the heroes are from his timeline when he sees his fellow Illuminati Black Panther and Mister Fantastic. Sheriff Strange reveals they have been in stasis for eight years and that God Emperor Doom saved them all when he created Battleworld. In Utopolis, the Cabal and the Maker are discovered by the Thor Corps.

Issue four

In Utopolis, the Thor Corps battle Thanos, the Cabal, and the Maker. On the Isle of Agamotto, Sheriff Strange explains to the life rafters that the Beyonders were the ones behind the universes crashing together and that he and Doctor Doom were able to kill them and take their power. A wild boar version of Thor teleports to Castle Doom to report his findings. Sheriff Strange arrives at the battle with the raft survivors. God Emperor Doom also teleports to the battle and unleashes his power against the Cabal and the surviving members of the life raft. Cyclops, powered by the Phoenix Force, confronts God Emperor Doom and temporarily gains the upper hand. God Emperor Doom recovers, snaps Cyclops' neck, and orders the invaders to surrender. Sheriff Strange teleports the surviving members to safety. Enraged, God Emperor Doom kills Sheriff Strange with a blast of energy.

Issue five
After Sheriff Strange's funeral, God Emperor Doom enters a realm located below the Doctor Strange statue and talks to the real Molecule Man, who lives there. It is explained that the Beyonders were the originators of reality, but eventually became harbingers of destruction. The Molecule Man was unique across the multiverse: a being whose presence in each reality represented a sliver of a single inter-dimensional entity. The Beyonders would initiate the end of a particular reality by detonating that reality's Molecule Man. God Emperor Doom, Sheriff Strange, and the Earth-616 Molecule Man had gathered Molecule Men from across the multiverse and combined them into a bomb, which they directed towards the unsuspecting Beyonders. The detonation killed the Beyonders and allowed the Earth-616 Molecule Man to absorb their power and channel it to God Emperor Doom, who in turn created Battleworld.

Valeria's Justice Division of the Future Foundation prepares to hunt down the Earth-616 heroes and also the Cabal. Thor appears in Doomgard where the Thor Corps are located, Black Panther and Namor appear in Egyptia, Captain Marvel in Bar Sinister, and the Black Swan in Doomstadt. At the end of the issue, Thanos appears at the base of the Shield.

Issue six
Three weeks later, Battleworld is in disarray with several kingdoms in open rebellion. Someone called "the Prophet" has formed an army against God Emperor Doom, and has toppled the upper and lower kingdoms of Egyptia. God Emperor Doom orders his most loyal Barons (Mister Sinister, Maestro, Apocalypse, and Madelyne Pryor) to deal with the threat of the Prophet. Of the other Cabal members, only Proxima Midnight and Corvus Glaive have been captured, while the Black Swan offers help to God Emperor Doom. The Foundation find the source of God Emperor Doom's power and inform Valeria, who has become suspicious of her father.

Mister Fantastic and the Maker team up to find the source of God Emperor Doom's power, and send Spider-Man and Miles to infiltrate Castle Doom. The Spider-Men meet Valeria, who chooses not to go with them. Valeria demands to know who killed Sheriff Strange and Peter confirms Valeria's suspicions that no one from the raft was responsible. After entering a trapdoor under the Molecule Man's statue, the Spider-Men are confronted by the real Molecule Man. Meanwhile, Namor and Black Panther arrive at the Isle of Agamotto. Using the Key of Agamotto given to them by Sheriff Strange, they are given access to powerful items Sheriff Strange had collected over the years including the Siege Courageous and an Infinity Gauntlet that works only in Doomstadt.

Thanos, who had been captured by the Hel-Rangers, talks to the sentient structure that forms the Shield (a giant alternate version of Ben Grimm), and convinces him to reject God Emperor Doom and rise, causing the Shield to fall down.

Issue seven
The Prophet, who is revealed to be Maximus, marches his troops to Castle Doom. Baron Sinister takes the chance to turn against Baroness Pryor, but is subsequently struck down by the former Baron Apocalypse. The Thor Corps joins the battle against God Emperor Doom, as Jane Foster has managed to convince her fellow Thors to fight against their god. Former Baron Maestro joins the battle with his army of Worldbreakers. The two Reed Richards use the fight ensuing on the steps of Castle Doom as cover to infiltrate the building and steal "the most valuable thing that's left from the Multiverse" from God Emperor Doom. The Black Panther and Namor travel to the Deadlands for reinforcements and the Black Panther uses his title as the King of the Dead to convince the zombies to join the forces opposing God Emperor Doom.

Issue eight
Chaos continues on the outskirts of Castle Doom. Mister Fantastic, Maker, and Star-Lord fly to Castle Doom, but a Hulk causes their ship to crash. The Maestro calls God Emperor Doom out to face him, but is met instead by the giant Ben Grimm who is destroying everything in his path. Susan, Valeria, and one of the Black Swans save God Emperor Doom. Grimm continues his rampage until Franklin and Galactus arrive. Franklin reveals God Emperor Doom is his father. Ben realizes Franklin is the son of Susan and allows the Franklin-controlled Galactus to destroy him rather than fight the boy. Susan bursts into tears until Valeria asks Susan to come with her.

In Castle Doom, Star-Lord is attacked by the Black Swan while he is repairing his ship. Star-Lord manages to prick his Groot 'toothpick' into the World-Tree, causing the toothpick to merge with the tree to form a giant Groot. Susan and Valeria head to the statues of the Molecule Man and Sheriff Strange, but stop when they see the Mister Fantastic and Maker.

God Emperor Doom arrives on the battlefield and gives Thanos a chance to be a Baron. Thanos refuses the offer as he believes he is already a god. God Emperor Doom rips out Thanos' skeleton. The battle continues until Captain Marvel spots the zombies coming from the remains of the Shield. Black Panther (with the Infinity Gauntlet) and Namor arrive, declaring to God Emperor Doom that his reign is over.

Issue nine
Namor and Black Panther battle with God Emperor Doom wielding the power of the Beyonders and the Black Panther wielding the Infinity Gauntlet. Susan does not recognize Mister Fantastic and accuses him of being one of the "murderers" of Sheriff Strange. Mister Fantastic reveals that God Emperor Doom killed Sheriff Strange. Mister Fantastic and Maker meet with Molecule Man, after which Maker betrays Mister Fantastic by trapping him in a temporal bubble that devolves him into an ape. Molecule Man intervenes, rescuing Mister Fantastic while splitting the Maker into meat slices. Back on the battlefield, God Emperor Doom realizes Black Panther's fight is a distraction, and teleports to the Molecule Man's statue to confront Mister Fantastic.

God Emperor Doom tries to use his powers to destroy his rival, but he finds that Molecule Man has taken away most of his abilities so that the confrontation between the two will be fair. Mister Fantastic and God Emperor Doom face off. God Emperor Doom, exclaiming of how it always comes down to him and Mister Fantastic like this, begins gaining the upper hand by mocking Mister Fantastic for, as the genius that he is, not having been able to find a way to save the entire Multiverse. Mister Fantastic counters by calling God Emperor Doom out for his insecurity, as the first thing that God Emperor Doom did when he obtained the Beyonders' powers was to steal Mister Fantastic's life and family, making God Emperor Doom confess that Mister Fantastic would have done a better job with the Beyonders' power. Hearing this, the Molecule Man transfers the Beyonders' power to Mister Fantastic, which destroys Battleworld. In the wake of the destruction, the Black Panther uses the Reality Gem to recreate and teleport himself to Wakanda. There, he finds three Wakandan prodigies (the same he talked to in New Avengers #1) to whom he tasks with granting wisdom to the stars.

Miles Morales awakens on the restored Earth-616, now known as Marvel's Earth Prime, along with his friends and his mother (who was brought back to life by the Molecule Man as gratitude for giving him a hamburger). Still shaken by the recent events, Miles goes on patrol with Peter as Spider-Man. Meanwhile, Mister Fantastic, Invisible Woman, Valeria, Franklin, the members of Future Foundation, and Molecule Man work to restore the Multiverse one reality at a time. In Latveria, Doctor Doom removes his mask, reveals his face is no longer disfigured, and laughs with joy.

Battleworld

Following numerous incursions across the multiverse, the remains of various realities have been fused together to create a new Battleworld. Each domain is the incursion point from that reality's destruction, as this is all that remains from each one. All of these realities are known as domains and have the ability to interact with each other, except for three: the Deadlands, Perfection and New Xandar. These domains are separated from the rest by a giant wall called the Shield because they contain threats that, if set loose, would destroy all the others: zombies, Ultron drones, creatures that make up the Annihilation Wave, and an alternate reality version of Thanos trying to reconstruct the Infinity Gauntlet.

Each domain has an appointed leader called a Baron, who runs their domain with permission from God Emperor Doom, the Lord and Messiah of Battleworld. To ensure all domains remain separate from each other, the Thor Corps have been formed (containing all alternate versions of Thor) and they act as a police force for Battleworld under the leadership of Sheriff Strange. Those who transgress the borders are sent to the Shield to work there whilst those who spectacularly break this rule are sent into exile over the Shield into one of the three dangerous domains.

Battleworld is one of the three celestial bodies in its universe. The second celestial body and Battleworld's source of light is revealed to be the Human Torch himself who acts as the "Sun" after being lifted into the sky during the early days of Battleworld's creation and where he still remains trapped as punishment for acting against God Emperor Doom. The Sun orbits Battleworld instead of the other way around. The third celestial body is Knowhere, which orbits Battleworld as its "Moon". Apart from these celestial bodies, there were no other stars, until Singularity, a mysterious young girl who actually represents a pocket universe that gained sentience during the multiversal collapse, appeared to give her life to save the citizens of Arcadia from a horde of zombies, which returned the stars to its universe.

The reality where Battleworld was fashioned has since been dubbed as Earth-15513.

Titles

Secret Wars

Battleworld

Reception 
According to review aggregator Comic Book Roundup, Issue #0 received an average score of 7.9 out of 10 based on 5 reviews. Mat Elfring from Comic Vine wrote "If you're a Marvel fan, this book is a must have, for the SECRET WARS part. Sure, the ending doesn't feel like it works as smoothly as everything else, but this is a great catch-up to the upcoming event and it's great to see it all through the eyes of the Future Foundation."

Issue #1 received an average score of 8.2 out of 10 based on 46 reviews. Jeremy Matcho from All-Comic wrote "This is how an event should start. Hickman blew the gates off of this issue and laid down the bar for every event issue in the future. Great writing mixed with great art and even better build up makes Secret Wars a cant miss read! " 

Issue #2 received an average score of 8.5 out of 10 based on 40 reviews.  Tony 'G-Man' Guerrero from Comic Vine wrote "There's so much to see here. It's not just hero fighting hero. The other areas of Battleworld are being set up but there's a deep story going on here as well. Hickman, like the 'god' character we see here is creating a fascinating story with the idea of Battleworld and how each area relates to one another. The more you see, the more you want to see. Hickman makes it hard not to be excited. Esad Ribic's art and Ive Svorcina's colors gives this a great vibe. If you are craving more big fights, it looks like you'll be getting some of that as well as Hickman continues to set the stage for big things" 

Issue #3 received an average score of 8.6 out of 10 based on 34 reviews. Chuck from Chuck's Comic of the day wrote "The slam on the original Secret Wars maxi-series was that the story was simplistic. You'll find no such complaints here."

In other media

Film
 Doctor Strange and an alternate-world Christine Palmer visit an Earth affected by an Incursion in the Marvel Cinematic Universe movie Doctor Strange in the Multiverse of Madness. At the end of the film, Clea, a sorcerer from the Dark Dimension, informs Strange that his actions from the film have caused another incursion. Strange follows Clea into the Dark Dimension.
In July 2022 at the San Diego Comic Con, producer and head of Marvel Studios, Kevin Feige, announced that a film adaptation, Avengers: Secret Wars was in development as part of Phase Six of the Marvel Cinematic Universe (MCU), and is to be released on May 1, 2026, directly following Avengers: The Kang Dynasty on May 2, 2025.

Video games
 The "Secret Wars" version of various Marvel characters appear as playable or non-playable in the mobile game Marvel: Future Fight.
 Characters based from the "Secret Wars" and the "Spider-Island" versions appear in the mobile game Spider-Man Unlimited.
 The "Secret Wars" storyline is featured in Marvel: Mighty Heroes.
 Incursions were incorporated into the gameplay and plots of Marvel: Avengers Alliance.
 Characters from the "Secret Wars" are available in the mobile game Marvel: Battle Lines.
 God Emperor Doom appears as the final boss in the Expansion Pass of Marvel Ultimate Alliance 3: The Black Order.
 Marvel Realm of Champions is set on the patchwork Battleworld made from various alternate Earths, which is divided into "Houses" ruled by the "Barons".
 Marvel Future Revolution adapts the storyline directly, depicting collisions between alternate Earths that obliterate them both, which in-game is called "Convergence". The heroes of one Earth attempt to save their Earth, but fail. Vision then sacrifices himself to merge several Earths together peacefully into a single Primary Earth, which contains regions such as technologically advanced New Stark City or Earth colonized by refugees from Xandar.

See also
 Convergence
 List of All-New, All-Different Marvel publications
 Doctor Strange in the Multiverse of Madness

References

External links
 Secret Wars 2015 at Marvel.com

2015 comics debuts
2015 in comics
Comics by Jonathan Hickman
Comics about parallel universes
Comics set on fictional planets
Secret Wars
Superhero comics
Comic book reboots
Comics about the end of the universe
Marvel Comics adapted into films